Peter Lynch (14 February 1964 – 26 January 2017) was an Australian mining engineer.

Career
Lynch was born in Caringbah, New South Wales, the second child of Dr Gilbert Lynch a general surgeon in the St George region of Sydney, and wife Judy. He attended local Catholic schools, then studied mining engineering at the University of New South Wales, graduating in 1988. After moving to Queensland to work on coal projects,he met his wife Laura, a geologist from Sydney. The couple had three children - Alicia, Sebastian Gilbert and George.

In 1995, he was appointed Mine Manager of Mount Isa Mines' (MIM) Oaky North Underground Mine, a poorly-performing mine, which he turned into a profitable venture within three years. MIM then appointed him general manager of Lead Zinc Development and by 2002 he was the managing director of Australian Premium Coals Pty Ltd. (APC).

Lynch left MIM to work with Gallipoli Mining (a subsidiary of JX Holdings), then was involved in the set-up of Galilee Basin coal giant Waratah Coal in 2006. He was President and CEO for several years, but, citing family reasons, left in 2010, shortly after the buyout of the company by Clive Palmer.

He also held an interest in several property developments including Evans Head AirPark, a residential air park development for people who own private planes.

Death

By 2016, Lynch was living in between mining operations he was supervising in Indonesia, and his new home base in Perth.

He died with his new girlfriend, Endah Cakrawati, on 26 January 2017 when his private plane, a Grumman G-73 Mallard, crashed into the Swan River during Australia Day celebrations in Perth. His daughter was visiting him at the time but had not joined him for the flight. The City of Perth Skyworks fireworks display was subsequently cancelled.

References

External links
 Cokal Ltd.: Board of Directors

1964 births
2017 deaths
Accidental deaths in Western Australia
Australian mining engineers
Australian mining entrepreneurs
Aviators killed in aviation accidents or incidents in Australia
University of New South Wales alumni
Victims of aviation accidents or incidents in 2017
People from New South Wales